General Crack is a 1928 historical novel by the British writer Marjorie Bowen, written under her pen name of George Preedy.

Film adaptation
In 1929, it was adapted into a Hollywood film of the same title directed by Alan Crosland. Produced as an early talkie during the conversion from silent film it starred John Barrymore, Lowell Sherman and Marian Nixon.

References

Bibliography
 Goble, Alan. The Complete Index to Literary Sources in Film. Walter de Gruyter, 1999.
 Tibbetts, John C. The Furies of Marjorie Bowen. McFarland, 2019.

1928 British novels
British historical novels
British novels adapted into films
Novels by Marjorie Bowen
The Bodley Head books